Fearnot is an unincorporated community in Schuylkill County, in the U.S. state of Pennsylvania.

History
A post office called Fearnot was established in 1892, and remained in operation until it was discontinued in 1920. The origin of the name Fearnot is obscure. According to tradition, the name "Fearnot" stems from the frequent fighting in the neighborhood; the early townspeople were not afraid of anyone.

References

Unincorporated communities in Schuylkill County, Pennsylvania
Unincorporated communities in Pennsylvania